Daniel Billig (born 02 June 1970) is a German politician for the Alliance '90/The Greens and since 2018 member of the Abgeordnetenhaus of Berlin, the state parliament of Berlin.

Politics 

Billig was born 1970 in the West German town of Monschau and studied at the Free University of Berlin.
Billig became member of the Abgeordnetenhaus in 2018.

References 

Living people
1970 births
21st-century German politicians
Members of the Abgeordnetenhaus of Berlin
People from Monschau
21st-century German women politicians